Jean-Baptiste Rué (born 6 July 1974, in Boulogne-Billancourt, France) is a French rugby union player who plays hooker for SU Agen. He was playing when they lost the final of the Top 14 against Biarritz Olympique.

Rué made his international début for France in June 2002, against Australia, but would have to contend with Olivier Azam, Yannick Bru, but mostly Raphaël Ibañez for the French hooker number 2 shirt.

External links
 

1974 births
Living people
French rugby union players
France international rugby union players
Sportspeople from Boulogne-Billancourt
Rugby union hookers